NCAA Season 92 is the 2016–17 collegiate athletic year of the National Collegiate Athletic Association in the Philippines. It is hosted by the San Beda College. The turnover ceremony of the NCAA flag from Mapua to San Beda was held at the Pearl Manila Hotel on April 6, 2016.

The formal opening ceremonies, to be directed by theater play director Roxanne Lapus and choreographer Douglas Nierras, will be held at the Mall of Asia Arena, Pasay on June 25, 2016. The highlight of the opening of NCAA Season 92 is the retirement ceremony of the #14 jersey of Philippine basketball legend Carlos Loyzaga by the host school, San Beda. This will be followed by the first games of men's basketball preliminary round.

For the second year in the row, ABS-CBN Sports and Action will be providing broadcast coverage for the NCAA Season 92.

Sports calendar
This is the tentative calendar of events of the NCAA Season 92. The list includes the tournament host schools and the venues.

First semester

Second semester

Basketball

The NCAA Season 92 basketball tournaments of the NCAA Season 92 will be commenced on June 25, 2016, at the Mall of Asia Arena, Pasay.

Seniors' tournament

Elimination round

Playoffs

Juniors' tournament

Elimination round

Playoffs

Volleyball

The volleyball tournament of NCAA Season 92 started on November 14, 2016, at the Filoil Flying V Arena. College of Saint Benilde is the event host. All teams participate in an elimination round which is a round robin tournament. The top four teams qualify in the semifinals, where the unbeaten team bounces through the finals, with a thrice-to-beat advantage, higher-seeded team possesses the twice-to-beat advantage, or qualify to the first round. The winners qualify to the finals. Also starting this season, volleyball (men's and women's) will become the 4th mandatory sport (aside from basketball, athletics and swimming) for all NCAA member schools. Junior's volleyball will be soon to be followed.

Men's tournament

Elimination round

Playoffs

Women's tournament

Elimination round

Playoffs

Juniors' tournament

Elimination round

Football
The football tournament started in November 2016 at the Rizal Memorial Football Field.

Seniors' tournament

Elimination round

Team standings

Match-up results

Scores

Juniors' tournament

Elimination round

Team standings

Match-up results

Scores

Chess
The chess tournament of NCAA Season 92 has been started on August 6, 2016, at the Jose Rizal University gym in Mandaluyong. Two-time defending champion Arellano Chiefs will defend the championship title against other participating chess teams.

Seniors tournament

Elimination round

Event host in boldface

 Match-up results

Scores

Round of Four

 Match-up results

Scores

Juniors tournament

Elimination round

Event host in boldface

 Match-up results

Scores

Round of Four

 Match-up results

Scores

Badminton
The badminton tournament of NCAA Season 92 started on August 31, 2016, at the Rizal Memorial Sports Complex badminton court in Malate, Manila.

Seniors tournament

Elimination round

Event host in boldface

 Match-up results

Scores

Round of Four

 Match-up results

Scores

Women's tournament

Elimination round

Event host in boldface

 Match-up results

Scores

Round of Four

 Match-up results

Scores

Juniors tournament

Elimination round

Event host in boldface

 Match-up results

Scores

Round of Four

 Match-up results

Scores

Swimming
The swimming events of Season 92 were held on September 9–11, 2016 at the Rizal Memorial Sports Complex.

Men's tournament
Event host is boldfaced.

Most Valuable Player:  Joshua Junsay
Rookie of the year:  Luis Evangelista

Women's tournament
Event host is boldfaced.

Most Valuable Player:  Maria Aresa Lipat
Rookie of the year:  Febbie Mae Porras

Juniors' tournament
Event host is boldfaced.

Most Valuable Player:  Miguel Karlo Barlisan
Rookie of the year:  John Soriano

Table Tennis
The Table Tennis tournament of NCAA Season 92 started on September 18 until October 2 at the Letran Gym in Intramuros, Manila.

Seniors' Tournament

Elimination round

Event host in boldface

Round of Four

Event host in boldface

Women's tournament

Elimination round

Event host in boldface

Round of Four

Juniors' Tournament

Elimination round

Event host in boldface

Round of Four

Event host in boldface

Taekwondo
The Taekwondo tournament of NCAA Season 92 started on October 14 until October 16 at the Letran Gym in Intramuros, Manila.

General championship summary
The current point system gives 50 points to the champion team in a certain NCAA event, 40 to the runner-up, and 35 to the third placer. The following points are given in consequent order of finish: 30, 25, 20, 15, 10, 8 and 6.

Seniors' division championships

Medal table

Overall championship tally

Demonstration sports like men's soft tennis, women's lawn tennis, women's badminton, and cheerleading are not included in the overall championship tally, but it is included in the medal table.

Juniors' division championships

Medal table

Overall championship tally

Broadcast coverage

Play-by-play:
Andrei Felix
Martin Javier
Anton Roxas

Analysts (Basketball)
Martin Antonio
Migs Bustos
Mikee Reyes
Olsen Racela
Renren Ritualo

Analysts (Volleyball)
Denden Lazaro
Michele Gumabao
Carmela Tunay

Courtside Reporters:
Sarah Carlos
Roxanne Montealegre
Ceej Tantengco

Previous Courtside Reporter of NCAA
Brandy Kramer
Eric Tipan
Myrtle Sarrosa

See also
UAAP Season 79

References

2016 in multi-sport events
2017 in multi-sport events
2016 in Philippine sport
National Collegiate Athletic Association (Philippines) seasons